Décius was a Société populaire-class corvette launched in 1795 in Brest. Originally named Doucereuse, she was renamed to Décius in 1795. The British Royal Navy destroyed her in November 1796.

Career
Décius was appointed to the Saint Martin station in 1796, under Lieutenant Louis-André Senez. On 27 November, she took part in the French invasion of Anguilla, along with the gun-brig Vaillante, and three schooners. In the raid, the French captured 21 ships and took 900 prisoners. Returning to Guadeloupe, the French flotilla encountered the frigate , under Captain R. Barton. Décius engaged Lapwing in order to cover the retreat of the weaker ships, and fought for two hours before striking her colours.

Lapwing then destroyed Vaillante, and took possession of Décius. Barton found that she had suffered about 80 men killed and 40 wounded. He took 170 prisoners. The next day two French frigates,  and Pensée, chased Lapwing. Barton took the prisoners aboard Lapwing and set fire to Décius. Lapwing then returned to St Kitts.

Citations and references
Citations

References
 
 

 

1795 ships
corvettes of the French Navy
Captured ships